BlackGirl is an American pop/dance vocal trio consisting of Pam Copeland, Nycolia "Tye-V" Turman, and Rochelle Stuart from Atlanta, that formed in 1992 on the Kaper/RCA/BMG label.

Biography
BlackGirl released their debut album Treat U Right in 1994. Warren Marshall  of the Columbus Times remarked: "Blackgirl -- the ultimate definition of today's `90's girls." They released their debut single "Krazy" in 1993, which was one of four consecutive top forty singles on the Billboard R&B chart,  "Krazy" (No. 37), "90's Girl" (No. 13), "Where Did We Go Wrong" (No. 39) and "Let's Do It Again" (No. 25). By the time "90's Girl" was released the album has US sales of over 500,000 units.

By the end of 1994, BlackGirl toured the United States with R. Kelly for a six-week tour, appeared on Soul Train, and in a Chrysler commercial, and released the holiday single "Give Love On Christmas Day"/"Christmas Time". The group then teamed up with Aaliyah, En Vogue, Mary J. Blige, Vanessa Williams, For Real, and SWV for the single "Freedom" from the film, Panther. The single became BlackGirl's fifth Top forty single, when peaked at number eighteen.

On September 24, the band performed at the 1994 Georgia Hall of Fame gala honoring Isaac Hayes.

In 1995, the band earned two Soul Train Award nominations, Single of the Year (By A Group, Band or Duo) for "Let's Do It Again" and Album of the Year (By A Group, Band or Duo) for Treat U Right. They then released "90's Girl" in the UK, the song was a Top five success on the R&B chart, and reached #23 on the UK Singles Chart. The group appeared on the single "Hey, Look Away" by Questionmark Asylum in late 1995, and at the end of the year the group performed with Chuck Berry at Apollo Theater Hall of Fame ceremony.

In 1996 the group disbanded. In 2010, Stuart released a gospel album titled I Choose Jesus, billed as Rochelle Morgan.

In 2013 AllMusic.com named "Krazy" the #35 Best R&B Song of 1994. 
The original lineup of Blackgirl reunited in late 2016 with an updated version their hit, "Where Did We Go Wrong." 2017 finds Blackgirl with new tour dates listed on their official website http://www.theofficialblackgirl.com

Humanitarian work
On January 7, 1995 BlackGirl took part in 'The Lou Rawls Parade of Stars' to benefit the United Negro College Fund. In March 1995 BlackGirl joined Naomi Campbell, Coolio, Aaliyah and Naughty by Nature as part of CounterAID, a benefit for AIDS. The program raised over $200,000.

Discography

Treat U Right (1994)

Awards and nominations

References

External links
 BlackGirl on Myspace
 Rollingstone.com Contains a profile and discography

American soul musical groups
American pop girl groups
African-American girl groups
Musical groups from Atlanta